Aghzavar (also Romanized as Aghzavār and Aghzevār; also known as Kalāteh-ye Aghzavār, Kalāteh Aghzvār, and Kheyrābād) is a village in Momenabad Rural District, in the Central District of Sarbisheh County, South Khorasan Province, Iran. At the 2006 census, its population was 63, in 15 families.

References 

Populated places in Sarbisheh County